Ungava is a provincial electoral district in the Nord-du-Québec region of Quebec, Canada that elects members to the National Assembly of Quebec.  It includes all of the Nord-du-Québec region (which is also a single census division) except for the Naskapi village municipality of Kawawachikamach.

It covers the Ungava Peninsula of northern Quebec and notably includes the municipalities and communities of Chibougamau, Chisasibi, Mistissini, Kuujjuaq, Eeyou Istchee Baie James, Waskaganish, Puvirnituq, Lebel-sur-Quévillon, Inukjuak and Wemindji.

It was created for the 1981 election from Abitibi-Est and Abitibi-Ouest electoral districts.

In the change from the 2001 to the 2011 electoral map, it lost the unorganized territories of Caniapiscau and Lac-Juillet (in Côte-Nord region) to Duplessis electoral district.

Members of the National Assembly

Election results

^ Change is from redistributed results. CAQ change is from ADQ.

|-
 
|Liberal
|Victo Murray
|align="right"|5,371
|align="right"|40.00
|align="right"|-9.04
|-

|-

|Natural Law
|Steve Paquette
|align="right"|372
|align="right"|2.77
|align="right"|–
|}

|-
 
|Liberal
|Jacques Bérubé
|align="right"|6,199
|align="right"|49.04
|align="right"|+4.62
|}

|-
 
|Liberal
|Jacques Bérubé
|align="right"|5,497
|align="right"|44.42
|align="right"|+5.95
|-

|Christian Socialist
|Denis Turgeon
|align="right"|463
|align="right"|3.74
|align="right"|–
|}

|-
 
|Liberal
|Laurent Levasseur
|align="right"|6,052
|align="right"|38.47
|}

References

External links
Information
 Elections Quebec

Election results
 Election results (National Assembly)
 Election results (QuébecPolitique)

Maps
 2011 map (PDF)
 2001 map (Flash)
2001–2011 changes (Flash)
1992–2001 changes (Flash)
 Electoral map of Nord-du-Québec region
 Quebec electoral map, 2011

Chibougamau
Quebec provincial electoral districts